is a Japanese professional footballer who plays as a goalkeeper for Fujieda MYFC.

Club statistics
Updated to 23 February 2020.

Honours

Club
Ventforet Kofu
 Emperor's Cup: 2022

References

External links

Profile at Ventforet Kofu

1990 births
Living people
Chuo University alumni
Association football people from Osaka Prefecture
People from Yao, Osaka
Japanese footballers
J1 League players
J2 League players
Ventforet Kofu players
Association football goalkeepers
Fujieda MYFC players